Barahun Island is a small island of the Green Islands archipelago, in the Autonomous Region of Bougainville of northeastern Papua New Guinea.

It is located between Nissan Island and Sirot Island of the archipelago, and east of New Ireland island.

References

Islands of Papua New Guinea
Geography of the Autonomous Region of Bougainville
Solomon Islands (archipelago)